Blepharipoda is a genus of mole crabs, containing the following species:
Blepharipoda doelloi Schmitt, 1942
Blepharipoda liberata Shen, 1949
Blepharipoda occidentalis Randall, 1840
Blepharipoda spinosa (H. Milne-Edwards & Lucas, 1841)

Blepharipoda liberata is harvested for food in China and has been described as "delicious."

References

Hippoidea